John Lawrence was a sixteenth-century English Protestant martyr. His story was recorded in Foxe's Book of Martyrs.

He was executed in Colchester, Essex; he apparently had to be taken to the stake in a chair because the irons he had been kept in while imprisoned, coupled with the lack of food, had left him too weak to walk.

References

16th-century Protestant martyrs
16th-century executions by England
People executed for heresy
Executed British people
Executed English people
People executed by the Kingdom of England by burning
Year of birth unknown
People executed under Mary I of England
Protestant martyrs of England